John H. Howe may refer to:

 John H. Howe (architect) (1913–1997), American architect
 John H. Howe (judge) (1822–1873), American jurist